Alloclita deprinsi is a moth in the family Cosmopterigidae. It is found in Asia Minor.

Adults have been recorded in May and August.

References

Moths described in 2003
Antequerinae
Moths of Asia